Piran Kaliyar Legislative Assembly constituency is one of the seventy electoral Uttarakhand Legislative Assembly constituencies of Uttarakhand state in India. It includes Piran Kaliyar area of Haridwar District.

Piran Kaliyar Legislative Assembly constituency is a part of Haridwar (Lok Sabha constituency).

Members of Legislative Assembly

Election results

2022

See also
 Iqbalpur (Uttarakhand Assembly constituency)

References

External link
  

Haridwar
Assembly constituencies of Uttarakhand
2008 establishments in Uttarakhand
Constituencies established in 2008